The 2023 Jeonbuk Hyundai Motors season is their 30th season in existence, and the 29rd consecutive season in the K League 1. In addition to the league, the club will compete in the 2023 Korean FA Cup and in the 2023–24 AFC Champions League. The season's manager is Kim Sang-sik, who brought a more defensive approach in Jeonbuk matches ever since signing for them. Despite notable departures, the club have plenty of experienced players in this season's squad, from national team players to veterans with valuable experience after years playing either on South Korea or overseas.

Players

Out on loan

Transfers

Pre-season

Competitions

Overall record

K League 1 

The club finished as runners-up in the 2022 K League 1 season in a close race with eventual champions Ulsan Hyundai, which saw an end to an five-year streak of consecutive league titles. The club have never finished below the league's top 3 since 2009, and aims to repeat it for another year.

League table

Results summary

Results by round

Matches 
As usual, the league season will be played with 38 matches split in two stages. After 33 league matches between the 12 participating teams, the teams are split into the Final Round (Top 6 teams, which aims to won an AFC Champions spot) and Relegation Round (Bottom 6 teams, that aims to survive relegation).

Korean FA Cup 

The club will start the competition at the Round of 16, winning an bye to the round as a 2023–24 AFC Champions League team.

AFC Champions League 

The AFC plans to start the new Champions League season on September. Jeonbuk will start the competition at the group stage, having granted the spot through a 2nd-place finish at the 2022 K League 1 and the 2022 Korean FA Cup title.

Goalscorers 
Updated as of 14 March 2023.

References

External links 
 Official website 

Jeonbuk Hyundai Motors seasons
Jeonbuk Hyundai Motors